Michael Lehmann Boddicker (born January 19, 1953) is an American film composer and session musician, specializing in electronic music. He is a three times National Academy of Recording Arts and Sciences (N.A.R.A.S.) Most Valuable Player "Synthesizer" and MVP Emeritus, he was awarded a Grammy as a songwriter for "Imagination" from Flashdance in 1984. He is the president of The Lehmann Boddicker Group.

Early life and education
Boddicker grew up in Cedar Rapids, Iowa. His parents, Arlene Estelle (née Reyman) and Gerald "Jerry" Valentine Boddicker operated a music school and store in Cedar Rapids, which served students in all of Eastern Iowa. His mother was a nationally recognized accordionist.

While still attending Jefferson High School in Cedar Rapids in 1971, Boddicker enrolled full-time at the local Coe College, studying electronic music. By 1972, he continued studies at Coe College, focused on music composition and he started taking jazz studies at the University of Wisconsin. By 1973, he enrolled in 20th-century composition at the University of Iowa. That same year in 1973, Michael purchased a powerful portable semi-modular synthesizer, the ARP 2600.

By 1974, Michael moved to Los Angeles, and finds Paul Beaver as a mentor.

Career 
He was able to purchase a Minimoog and a Moog System 15 modular synthesizer by 1975. As a result of his purchase, he was asked by Bob Moog (the founder of Moog Music) to demonstrate their newest synthesizer, the Polymoog, at the 1975 summer National Association of Music Merchants (NAMM) convention.

He quickly found work as a session musician, and by 1977 appeared playing synthesizer, vocoder, accordion and keyboards on albums by many notables such as Quincy Jones, Randy Newman, The Manhattan Transfer and The Bee Gees.

One of Boddicker's earliest soundtrack collaborations of note was a score for a short experimental claymation film made by Gumby creator Art Clokey entitled "Mandala" (released in 1977). Soon after that he entered the mainstream with work on such films as Saturday Night Fever, Battlestar Galactica and The Wiz.

Boddicker is a Board Member of The Society of Composers and Lyricists (SCL), of Beverly Hills, California. He owns an audio post production facility, Sol7 (aka Sol Seven), in the Sherman Oaks neighborhood of Los Angeles, California.

In 2019, he co-founded the Los Angeles synthesizer music festival, Synthplex.

Personal life 
Boddicker was married to Cassandra Lee Jensen, from 1972 to 1980, ending in divorce. Boddicker officially changed his name to Michael Lehmann Boddicker when he married singer/conductor/actress Edie Lehmann on October 15, 1995 in Hollywood, California. He has four children, two of the children he had were with Edie Lehmann. They live in Southern California.

In January 1988, a New Jersey-born scam artist and criminal, Louis Figueroa had impersonated Michael Boddicker in order to gain a celebrity status and attain perks in the town of Kill Buck, New York.

He sued Michael Jackson's estate in 2016, alleging that he was unpaid for work and services provided early in his professional relationship with Michael Jackson.

Awards 
He was awarded a Grammy Award as a songwriter for "Imagination," from the movie Flashdance in 1984.

Boddicker was voted most valuable synthesizer player in 1981, 1982, 1984 by the National Academy of Recording Arts and Sciences. In 1991, in recognition of his achievements, contributions and furtherance of electronic music in the recording industry, he was presented with an honorary doctorate of music from Coe College. In 2003, Boddicker was inducted to the Iowa Rock 'n Roll Hall of Fame.

Film music
Among his film score credits as a composer are The Adventures of Buckaroo Banzai Across the 8th Dimension (1984), the score for The Adventures of Milo and Otis (1986), and additional music for Bulletproof (1996), "The Magic Egg: A Computer Odyssey" (1984) an Omni Max computer animated film, "Get Crazy" (1983), "White Water Summer" (1987), "F/X2 " (1991) with Lalo Schifrin, and "Starfire" (1992).

His contributions as a composer can also be heard in the film "Battlestar Galactica" (1978) which including the BattleStar Galactica theme song produced and arranged by Michael Boddicker. "Freejack" (1992), Michael Jackson's "Black or White" (music video), and "HIStory" (music video) video produced by and additional music underscore and "THE FLY" eleven cues to augment or replace the original score.

Artists that have recorded his songs and compositions include Lani Hall ("Go For The Heart"), Earth, Wind and Fire ("Opening Raise Tour"), Patti Austin ("Oh, No Margarita"), Michael Jackson ("Captain EO & HIStory Unveiling"), Isao Tomita's & YMO's Hideki Matsutake ("Automatic Collect", "Automatic Correct & Plan"), Kitaro ("The Silk Road"), Laura Branigan (Imagination) and David Hasselhoff.

He also performed on soundtrack of the Horizons attraction Walt Disney World's Epcot theme park.

Performer
As a session musician he played synthesizer on, among others, Michael Jackson's This Is It, HIStory, Thriller, Bad, "P.Y.T. (Pretty Young Thing)", Off the Wall''', Dangerous, Black or White, and We Are the World; Earth, Wind & Fire's Let's Groove; Lionel Richie's Hello, You Are, Running with the Night; Dazz Band's Let It Whip; Randy Newman's The Natural and Short People; Kenny Loggins' Footloose; Barbra Streisand's Somewhere; Cheap Trick's Surrender; The Jacksons' Shake Your Body; Pointer Sisters' He's So Shy; and Diana Ross's Missing You''.

Music department for television

References

External links 
 
 
 Intel Artist Profile
Michael Boddicker Interview (2013), NAMM Oral History Library

1953 births
Living people
Musicians from Cedar Rapids, Iowa
American film score composers
American male film score composers
Grammy Award winners
Coe College alumni
University of Iowa alumni
University of Wisconsin–Madison alumni
UCLA School of the Arts and Architecture alumni
Musicians from Iowa